Benguela Airport  is an airport serving Benguela, the capital city of Benguela Province in Angola.

The Benguela non-directional beacon (Ident: BG) is located on the field.

Airline and destination

See also
 List of airports in Angola
 Transport in Angola

References

External links
 
 OpenStreetMap - Benguela
OurAirports - Benguela

Airports in Angola
Buildings and structures in Benguela